Albrechtsen is a surname. Notable people with the surname include:

Frank Albrechtsen, New Zealand footballer
Holger Albrechtsen (1906–1992), Norwegian hurdler
Jacob Albrechtsen (born 1990), Danish footballer
Janet Albrechtsen (born 1966), Australian journalist
Martin Albrechtsen (born 1980), Danish footballer
Ole Albrechtsen (born 1924), Danish fencer
Sharmi Albrechtsen, Canadian-born American-Indian author